Metoolithus is an oogenus of fossil bird egg from Nebraska. It is known from a single, near-complete egg, as well as several eggshell fragments. They are small, (60 mm x 44 mm) and spheroid. They show a mix of avian and non-avian characteristics.

References

Fossil parataxa described in 2013
Egg fossils